Juan Aguilar (born 24 June 1989) is a Paraguayan footballer. He currently plays for Club Sol de América.

Career
Aguilar had played for Club Guaraní at 2009 Copa Libertadores. He played 3 out of 6 group stage matches.

In summer 2009, he was signed for Eupen on loan.

References

External links

1989 births
Living people
Paraguayan footballers
Paraguayan expatriate footballers
Cerro Porteño players
Club Guaraní players
AC Bellinzona players
Club Sol de América footballers
K.A.S. Eupen players
Paraguayan Primera División players
Belgian Pro League players
Challenger Pro League players
Association football midfielders
Paraguayan expatriate sportspeople in Switzerland
Expatriate footballers in Switzerland
Expatriate footballers in Belgium